is a former Japanese football player.

Club statistics

References

External links

1981 births
Living people
Kindai University alumni
Association football people from Nagasaki Prefecture
Japanese footballers
J1 League players
J2 League players
Avispa Fukuoka players
Montedio Yamagata players
Association football defenders